In March 1901, the Australian Army came into existence as the Commonwealth Military Forces through the amalgamation of the former colonies military forces. The existing regiments and battalions of the colonies were reorganised and renumbered due to their absorption into the national army and subsequently formed the first military units of a united Australia. At the outbreak of World War I, in July 1914, the Australian Government committed the First Australian Imperial Force (AIF), a fully volunteer force, to the war; all existing units were exempt from serving overseas due the Defence Act of 1903, which stipulated that they could only serve in Australian territory.

In 1921, the Citizens Force's regimental numbering system, used since federation, was replaced by a divisional structure when the Australian Government decided to continue the unit designations of the AIF and to continue the traditions of the units of World War I. This renumbering brought about the end of localised regiments, with battalions taking up their role as community recruitment organisations.

This list covers individual units, above or equivalent to a battalion, which were created or maintained after 1921, by either being militia units that were amalgamated and/or renumbered or being entirely new entities.

Armies 
The field army has been the largest ever created unit for the Australian Army and has only been utilised in the Second World War.

Corps 
In the history of the Australian Army, only during the world wars were tactical corps units raised.

World War I

World War II

Divisions

Infantry

Light Horse

Armoured

Brigades

Infantry

Regiments

Infantry

Administrative

Functional

Armoured

Cavalry

Light Horse

Artillery

Battalions

Infantry

Royal Australian Regiment 
Battalions of the Royal Australian Regiment (RAR) were formed in the aftermath of the Second World War, when Australian defence policymakers government decided to exchange the focus on the Militia to a permanent force. The battalions are as follows:

Australian Imperial Force 
Battalions of the Australian Imperial Force (AIF) were initially formed in the First World War as volunteer units for overseas service. The battalions are as follows:

Citations

Notes 

Military units and formations of the Australian Army